The Seven Churches of Revelation, also known as the Seven Churches of the Apocalypse and the Seven Churches of Asia, are seven major Churches of Early Christianity, as mentioned in the New Testament Book of Revelation. All of them are located in Asia Minor, present-day Turkey.

Description 
According to Revelation 1:11, on the Greek island of Patmos, Jesus Christ instructs John of Patmos to: "Write on a scroll what you see and send it to the seven Churches: to Ephesus, and to Smyrna, and to Pergamum, and to Thyatira, and to Sardis, and to Philadelphia, and to Laodicea." The churches in this context refers to the community or local congregations of Christians living in each city.

The seven churches 
The seven churches are named for their locations. The Book of Revelation provides descriptions of each Church.
 Ephesus (Revelation 2:1–7): known for having labored hard and not fainted, and separating themselves from the wicked; admonished for having forsaken its first love (2:4)
 Smyrna (Revelation 2:8–11): admired for its tribulation and poverty; forecast to suffer persecution (2:10)
 Pergamum (Revelation 2:12–17): located where 'Satan's seat' is; needs to repent of allowing false teachers (2:16)
 Thyatira (Revelation 2:18–29): known for its charity, whose "latter works are greater than the former"; tolerates the teachings of a false prophetess (2:20)
 Sardis (Revelation 3:1–6): admonished for – in contrast to its good reputation – being dead; cautioned to fortify itself and return to God through repentance (3:2–3)
 Philadelphia (Revelation 3:7–13): known as steadfast in faith, keeping God's word and enduring patiently (3:10)
 Laodicea, near Denizli (see Laodicean Church) (Revelation 3:14–22): called lukewarm and insipid (3:16)

Seven messages
The letters follow a common pattern. For example: the Lord first addresses each church and identifies Himself, then defines things that He knows about the church in question. After this, a challenge or reproach is given, followed by a promise. In all seven cases the admonition is included, "He who has an ear, let him hear what the Spirit says to the churches", although sometimes this comes before the promise and sometimes after.

Although the letters differ in length in accord with the needs of each community, all conclude with an appeal to hold fast and to listen to what the Spirit is saying to the churches. Each church is promised that everyone who conquers will be rewarded by Christ.

Some historicists typically interpret the seven churches as representing seven different periods in the history of the Western Church from the time of Paul until the return of Jesus Christ. Scofield states that "these messages by their very terms go beyond the local assemblies mentioned." He is of the opinion that the letters have a prophetic purpose disclosing the seven phases of the spiritual history of the Church. Other writers, such as Clarence Larkin, Henry Hampton Halley, Merrill Unger, and William M. Branham also have posited the view that the seven churches preview the history of the global Church.
 Historicism has been criticized by the Eastern Orthodox Fr. Dimitri Cozby, who writes that historicists take a greatly oversimplified view of church history: "Since dispensationalism is Protestant in origin its 'Church history' is strictly Western. The dispensations take into account almost nothing of Orthodox history after the period of the early councils which we share with the West."

Angels of the churches
Chapters 2–3 of the Revelation have specific messages for each of the seven angels of the seven churches. The message of each of the seven letters is directed to the angel of the particular church that is mentioned.

Origen explains that these "angels" are the guardian angels of the churches, a view upheld by Henry Alford. But Epiphanius explicitly rejects this view, and, in accordance with the imagery of the passage, explains it as the bishops.

John sees a vision of the Son of man, who walks among seven lampstands and has seven stars in his right hand.  states that "The seven stars are the angels of the seven churches, and the seven lampstands are the seven churches." The comparison of a teacher to a star is scriptural.

Augustine of Hippo's reason for interpreting angels of the churches as the prelates of the church is that St. John speaks of them as falling from their first charity, which is not true of the angels.<ref>Angels of the Churches, Catholic Encyclopedia</ref> Others would say that the falling away relates to the churches, not to the messengers, as each of the seven letters conclude with the words "He who has an ear, let him hear what the Spirit says to the churches."

The Amplified Bible states that Revelation 2:2 through to 3:18, "your" and "you" are in the singular, referring to the angel of each church. Much of what is said is rebuke and admonishment, so if the angels are heavenly beings, they may serve in some way as representatives of the sinful people in their churches. Jewish tradition maintained that every nation and individual has a guardian angel, and that when God is about to punish a nation, He first punishes its angel. There is even a story of Michael, the guardian angel of Israel, being rebuked by God for the sins committed in the time of Ezekiel.  So the original readers of Revelation might have assumed that the angels here are the guardian angels of the individual churches, sharing responsibility for the actions of the members.

In the New Testament, the Greek word for angels (άγγελος) is not only used for heavenly angels, but also used for human messengers, such as John the Baptist and God's prophets C.I. Scofield has noted that "The natural explanation of the 'messengers' is that they were men sent by the seven churches to ascertain the state of the aged apostle ... but they figure any who bear God's messages to a church."

 The Seven Churches of Asia by Alexander Svoboda 
In 1869, the London publishing firm Sampson Low, Son, and Marston published Alexander Svoboda's The Seven Churches of Asia. The Seven Churches of Asia is divided into three primary sections: an introduction written by English clergyman and Biblical scholar Reverend H. B. Tristram, Svoboda's personal travel account visiting the Seven Churches sites, and an itinerary detailing Svoboda's route. The book also includes twenty full-page photographs of the Seven Churches sites, photographed by Svoboda. These images are the first produced and published photographs of the Seven Churches. Photographs from Svoboda's Seven Churches project were exhibited in the rooms of the Arundel Society in London in 1868.

See also

 Biblical numerology
 Book of Revelation: chapter 1, 2, and 3
 Christianity in Anatolia during Roman times
 Classical planet
 Early centers of Christianity
 Eastern Christianity
 Events of Revelation (Chapter 1)
 List of Mesopotamian deities#Seven planetary deities
 Seven Archangels
 Seven Factors of Awakening
 Seven Pilgrim Churches of Rome
 Seven Spirits of God
 Summary of Christian eschatological differences

References

Further reading
 Halley, H. H., Halley's Bible Handbook (Grand Rapids, MI: Zondervan, 1978), p684
 Scofield, C. I., The Scofield Reference Bible (Oxford: Oxford University Press, 1967), p1332
 
 
 Hemer, Colin J. The Letters to the Seven Churches of Asia in Their Local Setting'' (JSOT Press, 1989), p283
 Clarance Larkin – The Book of Revelation Illustrated . A Study of the Last Prophetic Book of Holy Scripture (1919), P248

External links
 Catholic Encyclopedia: Angels of the Churches
 Catholic Encyclopedia: Asia Minor, see section titled "Spread of Christianity in Asia Minor"
 Seven Churches of Revelation
 Branham, W. M., An Exposition of the Seven Church Ages , Voice of God Recordings, Jeffersonville, Indiana, 1965.
 The True Trend Of the Church As Viewed Through Revelation Chapters 2 & 3 by Pastor Rocky Veach
 Seven Churches -Thoughts on the seven angels of Revelation

1st-century Christianity
Book of Revelation
Christian terminology
New Testament words and phrases
Prophets in Christianity
Seven in the Book of Revelation
Churches in Turkey